Hiram W. Johnson High School is a secondary school in the Sacramento City Unified School District, in the Tahoe Park South area of Sacramento, California, United States.

Notable alumni

 Henry Andrade, hurdler
 Bryan Barber, motion picture and music video director
 Ken Forsch, former Major League Baseball pitcher for Houston Astros and California Angels.
 Bob Forsch, former Major League Baseball pitcher for St Louis Cardinals and Houston Astros.
 Darnell Hillman, "Dr dunk" former National Basketball Association, and ABA player for Indiana Pacers and five other teams.
 Sal Viscuso (Class of 1966), actor

References

External links
 

High schools in Sacramento, California
Public high schools in California
1958 establishments in California
Educational institutions established in 1958